Fedorov is a lunar geologic feature ("crater" in IAU nomenclature) located in the western Mare Imbrium named after Russian rocket scientist . It lies east-northeast of the crater Diophantus, and southeast of Delisle. About 20 kilometers to the south-southeast is the slightly larger formation of Artsimovich.

This feature is slightly elongated and oddly shaped, with a ridge on the northern side. This ridge is about as large around the base as Federov crater, and rises about 0.8 km above the surrounding lunar mare.

References

External links
 LTO-39B1 Federov — L&PI topographic map of feature and vicinity

Impact craters on the Moon
Mare Imbrium